Mahatkarta Indrodjojo Kusumonegoro (born 8 May 1958), better known by the mononym Indro and also called as Indro Warkop, is an Indonesian actor and comedian. Indro is the only surviving member of the comedy group Warkop.

Career

Early career and success with Warkop
Indro's introduction to the Warkop group began in 1976 when he was still in high school. To increase his income, he applied to become a radio announcer in Prambors. At that time, other Warkop colleagues such as Dono, Kasino, Nanu Moeljono, and Rudy Badil wanted to make a broadcast program titled casual chat with a humorous topic. Indro, who was the youngest at that time, was invited to join. Since the show was broadcast, Indro and his four friends finally started to commit to being a comedian with the name Warkop Prambors. Indro's debut as a comedian at Warkop Prambors began when he was a farewell performer at SMA Negeri 9 Jakarta. At that time he was asked by Rudy Badil to replace his position, who often had stage fright. Indro is the only Warkop personnel who is not a student at the University of Indonesia because he is studying at the Pancasila University.

Together with Dono, Kasino and Nanu, Indro then developed the Warkop Prambors group by starring in their first film entitled Mana Tahaaan... which was released in 1979. Nanu then resigned from Warkop not long after the film was released. Since then until 1994, Warkop Prambors, which has now changed its name to Warkop DKI, has starred in a total of 34 comedy films and one docudrama.

Indro as "Indro" in the Warkop's movie
In Mana Tahaaan..., Indro plays the character Paijo who is described as a Javanese who comes from Purbalingga, Indro has played this character since he was broadcasting on Prambors radio. In Gengsi Dong it is known that Paijo is the son of a wealthy businessman in the oil sector. Then in GeEr - Gede Rasa it was revealed that Paijo has graduated from college and has become a doctor at a hospital.

When the production of Warkop was taken over by  Indro no longer played the character of Paijo and was changed to "Indro". This is reinforced by the typical sentence that Indro often says in his films, namely "emang gue pikirin?" In addition, as "Indro" he also plays several characters with different regional accents. In Sama Juga Bohong and Depan Bisa Belakang Bisa, Indro becomes a Betawi who lives in Cikampek, West Java. Then in Saya Suka Kamu Punya, Indro becomes a Batak.

Later career
After Pencet Sana Pencet Sini which was released in 1994, Indro together with Dono and Kasino agreed to no longer play in films because at the same time the film business in Indonesia was also sluggish due to the large number of adult-themed films and the invasion of imported films from Hollywood, Bollywood and Hong Kong. Production was then continued through a television series entitled Warkop DKI which is still being produced by Soraya Intercine Films. After Kasino died in 1997 and followed by Dono in 2001, Indro continued to use the group name Warkop even though he was alone. The last television series that used the Warkop title that he starred in was Warkop: Cewek OK, Cowok OK, which was released in 2004.

After a long hiatus, Indro returned to the big screen in 2011 through the film Semesta Mendukung. In this film he plays the character of Cak Kumis who comes from East Java. Indro later became the executive producer for the Warkop DKI Reborn series, which consisted of four films.

Personal life
Indro is the son of Moehammad Oemargatab and Soeselia Kartanegara. His father is a police officer while his mother is a catering businesswomen. When he was a child, Indro wanted to follow in his father's footsteps to become an officer, but his parents did not agree. Indro's father died in 1968. After his father's death, Indro helped his mother run a catering business by becoming a shopper.

Indro married Nita Octobijanthy in 1981. The couple has three children, Handika Indrajanthy Putri, Satya Paramita Hada Dwinita and Harleyano Triandro. Indro's second child, Hada Dwinita, was a member of the 2001 National Paskibraka team representing DKI Jakarta.

On 9 October 2018, Indro's wife died from lung cancer. Her body was buried in the Tanah Kusir Public Cemetery, South Jakarta.

References

External links

1958 births
Living people
Javanese people
Indonesian male comedians
Indonesian comedians
Indonesian male film actors
Indonesian male television actors
Indonesian male singers
Indonesian Muslims